Isakovo is a rural locality (a village) in Sosnovskoye Rural Settlement, Vologodsky District, Vologda Oblast, Russia. The population was 2 as of 2002.

Geography 
The distance to Vologda is 21.5 km, to Sosnovka is 2 km. Molitvino, Goluzino, Kindeyevo, Sosnovka are the nearest rural localities.

References 

Rural localities in Vologodsky District